Integral Equations and Operator Theory is a journal dedicated to operator theory and its applications to engineering and other mathematical sciences. As some approaches to the study of integral equations (theoretically and numerically) constitute a subfield of operator theory, the journal also deals with the theory of integral equations and hence of differential equations. The journal consists of two sections: a main section consisting of refereed papers and a second consisting of short announcements of important results, open problems, information, etc.  It has been published monthly by Springer-Verlag since 1978.  The journal is also available online by subscription.

The founding editor-in-chief of the journal, in 1978, was Israel Gohberg. Its current editor-in-chief is Christiane Tretter.

References

External links
 Journal homepage

Mathematics journals
Publications established in 1978